Aparisthmium is a plant genus of the family Euphorbiaceae first described as a genus in 1840. It contains only one known species, Aparisthmium cordatum, native to South America and Costa Rica.

References

Alchorneae
Monotypic Euphorbiaceae genera
Trees of Peru
Taxa named by Henri Ernest Baillon
Taxa named by Adrien-Henri de Jussieu